Beniardà is a municipality in the comarca of Marina Baixa in the Valencian Community, Spain.

The economy of Beniardà is exclusively based on agriculture. The most important monument in the town is the Catholic church of Sant Joan Baptista, built in the 16th century.

References

Municipalities in the Province of Alicante
Marina Baixa